is a Nippon Professional Baseball player for the Chiba Lotte Marines in Japan's Pacific League.

External links

NPB

Living people
1991 births
Japanese baseball players
Nippon Professional Baseball pitchers
Chiba Lotte Marines players
People from Fujisawa, Kanagawa
Baseball people from Kanagawa Prefecture